The Heights School is a preparatory school for boys in grades 3–12 in Potomac, Maryland, United States. Its mission is to assist parents in the intellectual, spiritual, and physical education of their sons. The Heights School offers a liberal arts curriculum in English, mathematics, classics, history, religion, science, Spanish, art, computers, and music.

As of 2017–2018, the school had an enrollment of 538 kids and 62.1 classroom teachers (on an FTE basis), for a student-teacher ratio of 8.7. Opus Dei, a personal prelature of the Catholic Church, supervises the school's religious orientation and spiritual formation. The local church authority, the Roman Catholic Archdiocese of Washington, however, does not include the Heights in their list of Catholic schools. Still, the faculty for the Catholic doctrine program as well as the curriculum are reviewed and approved by the Archdiocese of Washington.

Athletics

The Heights School currently has 12 different sports teams : cross country, golf, soccer, basketball, squash, swimming, wrestling, baseball, lacrosse, tennis, track and field, and rugby.

The Heights School is known for fielding especially strong soccer teams. Products of The Heights program include former national team and professional player Freddy Adu. Players from The Heights are often recruited by top programs.

In the fall of 2018 – the first year of membership in the WCAC – The Heights varsity soccer team won the Washington Catholic Athletic Conference championship following their undefeated season. The team was ranked #16 in the nation, and #2 in The Washington Post rankings.

History
A group of Catholic laymen, many belonging to the Prelature of Opus Dei ("Work of God"), founded the Heights as a middle school in Northwest Washington, D.C. in 1969. Among these was author and parenting expert James Stenson.

In 1978, The Heights purchased their campus in Potomac, Maryland and started the lower school. By 1983, construction of the main building allowed the entire school, grades three through twelve, to be united on the Potomac campus.

Scholarships
The Peter Vincent Galahad Blatty scholarship is given once every four years to an outstanding student in honor of William P. G. Blatty, son of the author of The Exorcist and member of the Class of 2005, who died of a heart condition.

Notable alumni
 Freddy Adu, professional soccer player; attended but eventually transferred

References

External links
The Heights School official website

Educational institutions established in 1969
Roman Catholic Archdiocese of Washington
Catholic secondary schools in Maryland
Opus Dei schools
Boys' schools in Maryland
Private high schools in Montgomery County, Maryland
Private middle schools in Montgomery County, Maryland
Private elementary schools in Montgomery County, Maryland
1969 establishments in Maryland
Schools in Potomac, Maryland